Miracle in Palermo! is a 2004 Italian comedy-drama film written and directed by Beppe Cino.

Cast 

 Tony Sperandeo as Sparagna 
 Vincent Schiavelli as Federico II 
 Luigi Maria Burruano as Fofò
 Maria Grazia Cucinotta as Sara 
 Michele Lucchese as Totò
 Valentina Graziano as Lina
 Alessandro Cremona as the Boss

See also 
 List of Italian films of 2004

References

External links

2004 films
Italian comedy-drama films
2004 comedy-drama films
Films set in Sicily
Films set in Palermo
2004 comedy films
2004 drama films
Films scored by Carlo Siliotto
2000s Italian films